The 2018 FC Tobol season is the 20th successive season that the club playing in the Kazakhstan Premier League, the highest tier of association football in Kazakhstan. Tobol will also play in the Kazakhstan Cup. After finishing the previous season in third position, Ordabasy would have qualified for the Europa League first qualifying round but they failed to obtain a UEFA licence, meaning that Tobol qualified in their place.

Season events
Prior to the start of the season, Vladimir Nikitenko was appointed as the club's manager following the expiration of Robert Yevdokimov's contract. On 1 August, Vladimir Nikitenko resigned as manager after Tobol were eliminated from the Europa League. Andrei Miroshnichenko was appointed as Caretaker manager before Marek Zub was announced as Tobol's new manager on 6 August 2018.

Squad

Transfers

In

Out

Loans in

Loans out

Released

Competitions

Premier League

Results summary

Results by round

Results

League table

Kazakhstan Cup

UEFA Europa League

Qualifying rounds

Squad statistics

Appearances and goals

|-
|colspan="14"|Players away from Tobol on loan:
|-
|colspan="14"|Players who left Tobol during the season:

|}

Goal scorers

Disciplinary record

References

External links

FC Tobol seasons
Tobol